The List of railway routes in Lower Saxony provides a list of all railway routes in Lower Saxony, northern Germany. This includes Intercity-Express, Intercity, Regional-Express and Regionalbahn services. In the route tables, the major stations are shown in bold text. Where intermediate stations are not given, these are replaced by three dots "...". The information is up to date to December 2015.

Intercity services

Regional services 
The following Regional-Express and Regionalbahn services run through Lower Saxony. They are grouped by operator.

DB Regio

S-Bahn Hannover

Erixx

Metronom

NordWestBahn

S-Bahn Bremen

WestfalenBahn

Smaller operators

Future
In December 2017 the following changes will occur:
RB61 (Bad Bentheim-Bielefeld) will be extended to Hengelo in the Netherlands and be operated by Eurobahn
RB66 (Osnabrück-Münster) will be operated by Eurobahn
RE78 (Nienburg-Bielefeld) will be operated by Eurobahn and will also operate at weekends

See also 
 List of scheduled railway routes in Germany

External links 
 kursbuch.bahn.de Timetables for all railway routes in Germany
 DB Regio Railway information Lower Saxony
  Timetable changes due to construction works in Lower Saxony (including map of lines)

References 

Lower Saxony
Transport in Lower Saxony
Lower Saxony-related lists
Lower Saxony